The 2016 Israel State Cup Final decided the winner of the 2015–16 Israel State Cup, the 81st season of Israel's main football cup. It was played on May 24, 2016 at the Teddy Stadium in Jerusalem, between Maccabi Tel Aviv and Maccabi Haifa.

Background
Maccabi Tel Aviv had previously played 34 Israel Cup Finals, had won the competition a record 23 times. Their most recent appearance in the final was the previous year's edition, in which they won 6–2 over Hapoel Beer Sheva at Sammy Ofer in Haifa.

Maccabi Haifa had previously played in 15 finals, winning five. Their most recent appearance in the final was the previous year's edition, in which they lost 2–1 to Hapoel Tel Aviv, and their most recent victory in the tournament was in 1998, beating Hapoel Jerusalem 2–0.

Maccabi Tel Aviv and Maccabi Haifa had played each other in four previous finals of the tournament. Maccabi Tel Aviv won in 2002 and 1987, and Maccabi Haifa won in 1962 and 1993.

The two teams played each other four times during the 2015–16 Israeli Premier League season. In the first instance, at Sammy Ofer Stadium on 26 September 2015, Tel Aviv won 2–0, Eden Ben Basat and Dor Peretz scoring. On 10 January 2016 at Bloomfield Stadium, Maccabi Tel Aviv won 2–1. Eran Zahavi and Tal Ben Haim gave them a 2–0 half-time lead. Yossi Benayoun shrinking down 2–1. On 17 April 2016 at Sammy Ofer Stadium the game end drew 0–0. The fourth match between the two teams was held in Bloomfield Stadium on 21 May 2016.

Road to the final

Details

References

Israel State Cup
State Cup
Cup 2016
Cup 2016
Israel State Cup matches